Adelheid von Rothschild (also Adélaïde de Rothschild,  19 August 1853 – 22 June 1935) was a member of the Rothschild family.

Biography
Adelheid was born on 19 August 1853 in Frankfurt. She was one of three daughters of Wilhelm Carl von Rothschild and Mathilde Hannah von Rothschild of the Naples branch of the Rothschild family.

Her paternal grandparents were Carl Mayer von Rothschild and Adelheid (née Hertz) von Rothschild.  Her maternal grandparents were Anselm von Rothschild and Charlotte Nathan Rothschild (the daughter of Nathan Mayer Rothschild).

In 1877, she married her cousin Baron Edmond Benjamin James de Rothschild (1845–1934), the youngest child of James Mayer Rothschild and Betty von Rothschild. Together, they were the parents of three children:

 James Armand Edmond de Rothschild (1878–1957), who married Dorothy Mathilde Pinto (1895–1988)
 Maurice Edmond Karl de Rothschild (1881–1957), who married Noémie Halphen (1888–1968)
 Miriam Caroline Alexandrine de Rothschild.

From the 1880s, Adelheid became involved in her husband's life work in Palestine. In 1954, her remains were laid to rest alongside those of her husband at Ramat HaNadiv in Israel.

Through her son Maurice, she was the grandmother of Baron Edmond Adolphe Maurice Jules Jacques de Rothschild (1926–1997), who married Nadine Lhopitalier (b. 1932).

References

External links

1853 births
1935 deaths
French philanthropists
19th-century German Jews
French people of German-Jewish descent
Adelheid
French Zionists
Edmond James de Rothschild